The Thirteenth Floor was a story originally published in the British horror comic Scream! from March 24, 1984, and also in Eagle when Scream! was absorbed into it (#128 to 258). It was written by "Ian Holland", a combined pseudonym of Alan Grant and John Wagner, and drawn by José Ortiz.

Originally, The Thirteenth Floor had a horror theme, like other Scream! strips. It was set in a tower block called Maxwell Tower, controlled by an experimental sentient computer called Max.

Plot

Max himself narrated the strip, and as befitting a computerised custodian of hundreds of people, was quite chatty and light-hearted. However, he was also portrayed as having a programming flaw reminiscent of the HAL 9000; programmed to love and protect his tenants, he could remorselessly kill anyone who threatened or even just annoyed them. In effect Max was a psychopath with no empathy towards anyone who was not a tenant.

Maxwell Tower had been built without a thirteenth floor (going straight from 12 to 14) for reasons of superstition; however due to a faulty Integrated Functions (I.F.) module, Max had the inexplicable ability to 'create' a 13th floor of his own, containing anything he desired, accessible from the building's lifts. Whilst he could produce any range of idyllic, surreal or mundane environments, Max seemed to have a personal taste for the horrific. In this sense The Thirteenth Floor seemed to be inspired by the Eagle strip The House of Daemon.

The 13th floor originally appeared to be a virtual reality, similar to the Holodeck concept in Star Trek which it preceded – for example, when a burglar shot a zombie with his gun, the lift's walls became riddled with bullet holes. However, later in the story the 13th floor was portrayed as somehow as an extension of Max himself – not only were lifts empty when people were 'on' the 13th Floor, if Max was switched off, they were 'lost'.

Max used his 13th floor to punish and torture anybody he felt deserved such treatment - often creating such fear and distress that they suffered a fatal heart attack or were driven insane. Typically, Max would notice a burglar, vandal or con-man through one of the many viewscreens, lure them into the lift, and take them to the 13th floor. Often their experience would contain subtle irony; for example a con-man claiming to be a pest controller would be chased by giant rats, or incompetent repairmen would be stuck in a burning facsimile of Maxwell Tower, in which all the doors and windows were jammed.

As the story progressed, Max's 'controller' Jerry Knight and local police became suspicious, so Max hypnotized a resident named Bert Runch and directed him to dispose of their corpses. After Jerry discovered the 13th Floor, Max hypnotised Jerry (for reasons including gaining Jerry’s tolerance of the 13th Floor’s continued existence), effectively reversing the role of controller and controlled. A local policeman, Sgt Ingram, discovered Max's actions and shut Max down. At this point Runch was on the 13th Floor and disappeared along with the floor. Jerry then switched Max back on and assisted in imprisoning Ingram on the 13th Floor before Ingram could tell anyone of the 13th Floor’s secrets.

The 13th Floor was finally discovered by others in Ingram's police department and Max was de-activated (losing Ingram who was 'inside' him), re-programmed and installed to run Pringles Department Store. However, the computer's new controller, Gwyn, inadvertently triggered a backup mechanism, re-activating Max's sentience, and before long he had deliberately burnt out his I.F. module and re-created the 13th Floor, this time accessible via the top of an escalator. Jerry never again appeared in the story after Max's move from Maxwell Tower.

By this point, the strip had been running in Eagle for some time, and the horror theme had been dropped in favour of more generic action-oriented stories. Max's character had been humanised, and he now saw anybody as a potential Pringle's customer, and thus a 'tenant' deserving of his care, rather than of punishment. Max uncovered secret activity by MI5 within the store, and programmed to be a patriotic computer, offered the 13th floor's services to MI5 for purposes such as interrogation, and even created a pocket-size version of himself, Minimax, to go on spy missions accompanied by the (hypnotized) local MI5 director, Auberon Hedges.

Max eventually became homesick and used his government contacts to arrange a return to Maxwell Tower, where he yet again resumed punishing people he felt harmed his tenants. Eventually, many of the building's tenants suffered a wave of madness resulting from paint fumes in the building affecting their minds and took to setting the block on fire, resulting in the block burning down and the strip ending in issue 258.

Max was afterwards supposedly installed in the King's Reach Tower headquarters of the Eagle comic. He was then portrayed as the comic's editor, with few Thirteenth Floor references, until the comic ended.

After Eagle
In 2007 Hibernia Books in Ireland published a collection of the first 11 episodes of Max's adventures, the first appearance of Max since Eagle ceased publication.

Following the acquisition of the rights to the series by Rebellion Developments, a Scream! & Misty Halloween Special was published in October 2017. This included a new The Thirteenth Floor story with a contemporary setting, along with other stories featuring characters from, or in the style of 1970s and 80s British comics, including Scream!, Misty. This revealed that the tower block had only been damaged and not destroyed in the final story and at some point Max had seemingly returned to the tower and been placed offline. In the story he is reactivated by a tenant and swiftly resumes his earlier activities.

In the 2018 Rebellion special "The Vigilant", Max appeared as a member of the super team of the same name, acting as Mission Control, and his 13th floor is used as an operations base. Max appears to be on good terms with the rest of the team and lets them use the 13th floor as a recreational space at the end of the mission.

Rebellion Reprints
Between 2018 and 2021, Rebellion published three volumes of reprints of The Thirteenth Floor:
 Volume 1 (17th October 2017) contains the strips from Scream! from 24th March 1984 to 30th June 1984 and Eagle & Scream! from 1st September 1984 to 13th April 1985
 A standard paperback and digital release
 A limited edition of 250 exclusive-to-webstore hardback version of the book, with an exclusive cover
 Volume 2 (21st October 2020) contains the strips from Eagle from 20th April 1985 to 22nd January 1986, with additional tales from the Scream! 1982 Holiday Special and the Eagle Holiday Special from 1986
 A standard paperback and digital release
 A limited edition of an exclusive-to-webstore hardback version of the book, with an exclusive cover
 Volume 3 (14th September 2021) contains the strips from Eagle and Scream! from 1st March 1986 to 28th February 1987 & Eagle Annual 1987
 A standard paperback and digital release
 A limited edition of an exclusive-to-webstore hardback version of the book, with an exclusive cover

References

External links
Review of Hibernia's 13th floor collection
Entry on International Hero website
Max MySpace fansite
Discussion of Hibernia's 13th floor (fustar.info)

Eagle comic strips